Sbamm! is a 1980 Italian comedy film directed by Francesco Abussi, starring Ezio Greggio.

Cast
Ezio Greggio as Pallone 
Valeria D'Obici as Pallone's girlfriend
El Pasador as the record producer
Cristina Moffa as the tourist guide
Umberto Carollo as Quercia

References

External links

1980 films
1980s Italian-language films
1980 comedy films
Italian comedy films
1980s Italian films